Chilarai College, established in 1973, is an undergraduate, coeducational college situated in Golakganj, Dhubri, Assam. This college is affiliated with the Gauhati University.

Departments

Arts and Management (BBA) 
 Assamese
 Bengali
 English
 Sanskrit
 History
 Education
 Economics
 Political Science
 Management

References

External links
 

Universities and colleges in Assam
Colleges affiliated to Gauhati University
Educational institutions established in 1973
1973 establishments in Assam